David Alan Ezra Dangoor  (born 1948) is a British businessman and philanthropist. One of four sons of Sir Naim Dangoor and Renée Dangoor, he spent his early life in Baghdad as part of  Iraq's Jewish community, leaving with his parents and his brothers in the 1960s for the United Kingdom, where he was educated at Carmel College and Imperial College London.

He is Exilarch of The Exilarch's Foundation, a charity that has initiated, guided and supported many causes, mainly relating to education and health, including Westminster Academy, Imperial College, the UK Space Design Competition, The Open University, Age UK, The UK Israel Tech Hub, the Weizmann Institute of Science, the Centre for Universal Monotheism, Faculty of Humanities and the Centre for Personalized Medicine at Bar Ilan University, Mishkenot Sha’ananim and Jewish Book Week. A subsidiary of The Exilarch's Foundation is Dangoor Education, which has supported Jewish Renaissance magazine and dozens of charities in the UK and Israel. He is a strong believer in strengthening UK-Israel ties and helps fund many initiatives that further these relations.

Dangoor has been Vice-President of the World Organisation of Jews from Iraq (WOJI) for the past ten years. He is a tireless activist for access to the Iraqi Jewish Archives and tries to use his background and heritage to ensure greater relations between Jews and Arabs.

A former President of the Board of the Spanish and Portuguese Jews’ Congregation, David Dangoor is President of Jewish Renaissance magazine and a Vice-President of the Jewish Leadership Council. He is a Deputy Lieutenant for Greater London and chairs the Lord Lieutenant of Greater London’s Council on Faith.

He was also made a Fellow of the British Exploring Society and an Honorary Fellow of the Royal Albert Hall.

Honours and awards

In 2017 Israel's Bar-Ilan University awarded  Dangoor an honorary doctorate, citing his "tireless efforts to further education, culture and art throughout the UK and Israel". He also received an honorary doctorate from The Open University in 2022. Accepting the award, he said: “Education was an important factor that allowed my family and me to rebuild our lives when we came from Iraq some years ago and we never forgot the lesson that education is the tool that you can bring with you wherever you are forced to move.” In presenting him for the honorary degree, the University cited Dangoor's "longstanding interest in education" and his belief in education's "lifechanging power" which has led him to become "one of the Open University's most important champions".  

In 2019 he received the Sternberg Interfaith Gold Medallion.

Dangoor was appointed Commander of the Order of the British Empire (CBE) in the 2021 Birthday Honours for services to the community in Greater London.

References

External links
Dangoor Education

1948 births
Living people
20th-century British businesspeople
20th-century British Jews
21st-century British businesspeople
21st-century British Jews
Alumni of Imperial College London
Bar-Ilan University alumni
British people of Iraqi-Jewish descent
Commanders of the Order of the British Empire
Deputy Lieutenants of Greater London
Iraqi emigrants to the United Kingdom
Iraqi Jews
Jewish British philanthropists
Jewish refugees
Naturalised citizens of the United Kingdom
People associated with the Open University

People from Baghdad
People from New York City
Royal Albert Hall